Centrosema, the butterfly peas, is a genus of (mainly tropical) American vines in the legume family (Fabaceae). Species include:

 Centrosema angustifolium Benth.
 Centrosema arenarium Benth.
 Centrosema brasilianum (L.) Benth.
 Centrosema dasyanthum Benth.
 Centrosema macranthum Hoehne
 Centrosema macrocarpum
 Centrosema plumerii (Turp. ex Pres.) Benth.
 Centrosema pubescens Benth.
 Centrosema sagittatum (Willd.) Brad.
 Centrosema vexillatum Benth.
 Centrosema virginianum

Lepidopteran caterpillars that feed on butterfly peas include the two-barred flasher (Astraptes fulgerator), occasionally recorded on C. macrocarpum and C. plumieri at least.

Another plant referred to as butterfly pea from the same subtribe Clitoriinae is the related Clitoria ternatea. However it doesn't belong to the genus Centrosema.

In Jamaica, it is known as Fee Fee and is usually seen at Christmas time. The flower is able to make a whistling sound hence children  usually find it useful as a toy.

See also
 Clitoria

Footnotes

References

 Brower, Andrew V.Z. (2006): Problems with DNA barcodes for species delimitation: ‘ten species’ of Astraptes fulgerator reassessed (Lepidoptera: Hesperiidae). Systematics and Biodiversity 4(2): 127–132.  PDF fulltext
 Hébert, Paul D.N.; Penton, Erin H.; Burns, John M.; Janzen, Daniel H. & Hallwachs, Winnie (2004): Ten species in one: DNA barcoding reveals cryptic species in the semitropical skipper butterfly Astraptes fulgerator. PNAS 101(41): 14812–14817.  PDF fulltext Supporting Appendices
 United States Department of Agriculture (USDA) (2007): USDA Plants Profile: Centrosema. Retrieved 2007-DEC-17.

Phaseoleae
Fabaceae genera